Edward Young Rice (February 8, 1820 – April 16, 1883) was a U.S. Representative from Illinois.

Biography
Born near Russellville, Kentucky, Rice pursued classical studies.
He studied law.
He was admitted to the bar in 1844.
He moved to Montgomery County, Illinois, and commenced practice in Hillsboro, Illinois.

Rice was elected county recorder in 1847.
He served as member of the State house of representatives in 1849 and 1850.
He served as judge of the Montgomery County Court in 1851 and 1852.
He served as master in chancery 1853-1857.

Rice was elected judge of the Eighteenth Judicial Circuit Court of Illinois in 1857 and reelected in 1861 and 1867.
He served as member of the State constitutional convention in 1869 and 1870.

Rice was elected as a Democrat to the Forty-second Congress (March 4, 1871 – March 3, 1873).
He was an unsuccessful candidate for renomination in 1872.
He resumed the practice of law in Hillsboro and Springfield, Illinois.
He died in Hillsboro, Illinois, April 16, 1883.
He was interred in Oak Grove Cemetery.

References

External links
 Judge Edward Young Rice, Historical Society of Montgomery County Illinois

1820 births
1883 deaths
People from Hillsboro, Illinois
Illinois state court judges
Democratic Party members of the United States House of Representatives from Illinois
Democratic Party members of the Illinois House of Representatives
19th-century American politicians
People from Logan County, Illinois
19th-century American judges